Artists Anonymous Theatre Network is a networking organisation for theatre creators in the UK. As of May 2009 the network consisted of over 1,000 different groups and individuals with branches in London, Scotland and the South East. The organisation aims to open a social space for creators of theatre to meet, discuss and collaborate. Artists Anonymous also acts as an advocacy group for its members concerns; both organising events for the community to address its problems and lobbying on its behalf.

History 
Artists Anonymous was founded in 2006 by Alexander Parsonage, artistic director of Finger in the Pie Theatre, with the aim of opening up social spaces for people involved with creating theatre in the capital.

Self Help Conference
On July 7, 2007 Artists Anonymous hosted an Open Space Conference on the subject of finding financial sustainability in the light of UK government cuts in arts funding as a result of their overspend on the 2012 Olympic Games. The conference was held at Middlesex University and attended by representatives of the Equity Actors Union, Independent Theatre Council and the Old Vic New Voices, as well as numerous theatre companies and individual practitioners. The conclusions of the conference were published by the Performance Initiative Network based at Brunel University.

2008 Relaunch
2008 saw an expansion of Artists Anonymous with Finger in the Pie project manager, Catherine Eccles appointed to run the organisation. PubClub was re-launched at the Phoenix Arts Club. Then Page to Stage, a script reading and development program, was launched to create a forum for developing new writing in collaboration with Jacksons Lane. Artists Anonymous also launched a series of master classes with the aim of bringing new skills into the network - as well as provide a networking environment based round specific interests.

2009 National Expansion
2009 saw the expansion of the network with franchises established in Scotland and the South East of England.

References

External links
 Artists Anonymous Theatre Network

Theatre in London